Tramp is a private, members-only nightclub located on Jermyn Street in central London, England. It was founded in 1969 by Johnny Gold, Bill Ofner and Oscar Lerman. The club built a reputation for discretion, banning photography and gossip writers from inside, and is popular with celebrities.

History 
Tramp was opened in December 1969 by Johnny Gold. It was owned by Gold, Bill Ofner and Oscar Lerman. The trio positioned Tramp as an alternative to the formal supper clubs which were then popular. They thought the club might survive for two or three years before its clientele moved on to another venue, and were surprised that it remained popular. The club was named after Charlie Chaplin's tramp persona. The club was outfitted smartly with oak panelling and chandeliers. The club had 300 founder members, all celebrities, who paid an annual fee of 10 guineas.

Gold banned all photography within the club and prevented paparazzi and gossip columnists from entering. Anyone who asked a guest for an autograph was also thrown out and Gold cultivated a reputation for discretion. When a newspaper described Tramp as a disreputable club attended by "tarty little pieces" Gold sued and won damages. Despite this, Gold was lenient with his regulars and rarely banned any. The Who's drummer Keith Moon was banned for a month after destroying a chandelier but Gold reduced this ban to 48 hours after Moon sent his chauffeur around with £500 in cash and phoned Gold, in tears, asking where else he would party; members were sometimes permitted to run up large bar tabs, Moon's reached £14,000 at one point. In contrast to rival club Annabel's, Gold refused to apply a dress code at Tramp; Tara Palmer-Tomkinson famously attended her 21st birthday party there wearing only a bikini and fur coat. Men were not allowed entry unless accompanied by women.

Joan Collins was a member, and the nightclub scenes in The Stud, a 1978 film adaption of her sister Jackie Collins's 1969 novel The Stud, were filmed inside Tramp. Gold thought he might have been the inspiration for the nightclub manager in the film. Gold established a Los Angeles branch of Tramp in the 1980s. In 1998, British businessman and racehorse owner Robert Sangster was interested in acquiring shares in Tramp. Gold sold his stake later that year to Caledonian Heritable, an Edinburgh-based property firm. Gold remained employed as "greeter-in-chief" until 2003 as he was the only person who knew the entire membership personally. There was some concern among members over the 2001 publication of Gold's memoir Tramp's Gold, but he maintained his discretion and it caused no scandal. The book's foreword was by long-time member Michael Caine.

Clientele
Over its history, Tramp has been frequented by many celebrities, socialites, aristocrats and royalty and has developed a "legendary" reputation for the antics of its clientele. Michael Caine said of the club "if you come out and you're not photographed it is either raining or your career is over". Tramp's opening night was attended by Caine, Collins, Peter Sellers, Natalie Wood, and Richard Harris. Other members included Madonna, Prince, Clint Eastwood, Rod Stewart and Mick Jagger. David Beckham took his newly single son Brooklyn to Tramp after Brooklyn's split from Chloë Grace Moretz. Kate Moss sang Happy Birthday to hair stylist Sam McKnight in the club for his 60th birthday.

Jackie Collins said that the happenings at Tramp gave her "more research than I can handle" for her racy novels; one of the wedding receptions of her sister Joan Collins was held at the club. Mickey Rourke and George Best once had a drinking contest at the club, and Best first met his wife Alex at the club.  Gold became close friends with film producer Dodi Fayed and claimed to have once dragged Fayed away from one young lady. When Fayed complained he told him "I happen to know she's sleeping with your father" (the billionaire Mohamed Al-Fayed). The James Bond actors Roger Moore, Sean Connery and George Lazenby all attended the club on one night. When on one occasion the club was flooded, Moore and fellow 'The Persuaders!' star Tony Curtis got on their hands and knees to help mop up the water.

American actress Shirley MacLaine used to regularly eat bangers and mash at the club and once fell asleep at her table. Marlon Brando often stayed until dawn and asked the staff to breakfast with him. Michael Douglas, Kathleen Turner and Danny DeVito turned up one night and found the club full, with no seats available. Gold located a stool for Turner and DeVito and Douglas had to sit on the stairs.  Tramp was the location where journalist Andrew Neil first met former Miss India Pamella Bordes. The meeting led to newspaper accusations alleging it was inappropriate for Neil to attend the club and to become involved with Bordes, Neil successfully sued the publishers for libel. Mel Brooks once ran around the club barking like a dog, and Moon became known for stripping naked inside. Upon leaving the club one night, Jack Nicholson kissed a homeless person who asked him for spare change. Gold once threw out footballer George Best and musician George Michael.

A young Princess Anne attended one night but excused herself early as she had to attend a Remembrance Sunday parade the following day. Princess Margaret and Peter Sellers also attended; Sellers, in a discussion with the Princess's husband Lord Snowdon, offered to swap his wife (Britt Ekland) with Margaret, but this was declined. Tramp was the location of Prince Andrew's first date with Koo Stark. Later Andrew dated Sarah Ferguson and they became regular attendees; Gold was invited to their 1986 wedding. Later Virginia Roberts, a victim of Jeffrey Epstein's sex-trafficking ring, claimed to have danced with Andrew at Tramp, though he denied it, stating that he was at Pizza Express in Woking at the time. Princes William and Harry were also regulars and were allegedly pursued to Tramp by Russian spy Anna Chapman. King Carl XVI Gustav of Sweden attended the club with Queen Silvia, and requested that the DJ play ABBA's "Dancing Queen", which had been played at their wedding.

References

External links

Nightclubs in London
Music venues completed in 1969
1969 establishments in England
Buildings and structures in Mayfair